Kohila Parish is the northernmost municipality of Rapla County, Estonia.

Settlements
Borough
Kohila

Small boroughs
Aespa - Hageri - Prillimäe

Villages
Aandu - Adila - Angerja - Hageri - Kadaka - Lohu - Loone - Lümandu - Masti - Mälivere - Pahkla - Pihali - Pukamäe - Põikma - Rabivere - Rootsi - Salutaguse - Sutlema - Urge - Vana-Aespa - Vilivere

The administrative centre of Kohila Parish is Kohila borough with population 3,505 (as of 1 January 2006). It is situated 33 km south to Estonia's capital, Tallinn and 22 km north to county's administrative center Rapla.

Religion

Local government
Current chairman of the council is Margus Miller from the electoral coalition "Minu Kohila".

Current mayor is Andrus Saare from the Union of Pro Patria and Res Publica.

Gallery

References

External links

 
Electoral coalition "Minu Kohila"